Anaglyptus mysticus, the rufous-shouldered longhorn beetle, is a species of beetle belonging to the family Cerambycidae, subfamily Cerambycinae.

This beetle is present in most of Europe, in Turkey and in North Africa.

The head and pronotum are black, while the elytra are reddish-brown at the front and blue-gray at the back, with three oblique light stripes in the middle. The body is hairy and has a bluish tone.

They are polyphagous in various species of herbaceous plants and deciduous trees, mainly feeding on Corylus avellana, Carpinus betulus, Fagus sylvatica, Acer campestre, Sambucus racemosa, as well as on Alnus, Crataegus, Rosa, Quercus species. Adults usually are found on flowers, while the larvae develop in dead branches and stumps of trees.

External links
 Biolib
 Cerambycoidea.com
 Cerambyx.uochb.cz
 Fauna Europaea

Anaglyptini
Beetles of North Africa
Beetles of Europe
Insects of Turkey
Beetles described in 1758
Taxa named by Carl Linnaeus
Articles containing video clips